Oreopanax arcanus is a species of plant in the family Araliaceae. It is found in Guatemala and Mexico. It is threatened by habitat loss.

References

arcanus
Flora of Mexico
Flora of Guatemala
Vulnerable plants
Taxonomy articles created by Polbot
Cloud forest flora of Mexico